Santosh Choubey is an Indian social entrepreneur and educationalist. He founded the All India Society for Electronics and Computer Technology (AISECT) in 1985. He is chairman of AISECT and chancellor of the AISECT group of universities (AGU) along with being involved in various literary and cultural activities to promote Indian Hindi literature and art.

Early life and education
Born in 1955 in Khandwa, Madhya Pradesh, Santosh Choubey did his schooling from Govt. School Khandwa and completed his education with a bachelor's degree in electronics and telecommunication Engineering from Maulana Azad National Institute of Technology (NIT, Bhopal). Consequently, he also got selected into the Indian Engineering Services (1976) and the Indian Civil Services (1981). He made the decision of forgoing the civil services and pursuing his interest in the areas of Science and Technology and joined Bharat Electronics Limited (New Delhi). Later on, he worked with IDBI as a consultant in Bhopal.

Career
He founded All India Society for Electronics and Computer Technology (AISECT) in 1985. The organisation became a registered society in 1997. AISECT group operates in 28 states and 4 Union Territories. AISECT is involved in various sectors including education, skill development, financial inclusion, CSR implementation, universities, online service provider etc. Over the years under the direct supervision of Choubey, AISECT has established a network of 23,000+ service delivery centres across the country. These end mile service delivery centres provide most of the services of AISECT group in rural and semi-urban areas creating thousands of entrepreneurs and serving millions of citizens of the country.

AISECT initiatives
AISECT organized the AISECT Women Achievers Summit 2016 on the occasion of International Women’s Day, focussing on women’s entrepreneurship. According to Choubey, the organization has always encouraged women to be a part of the professional world and has actively supported women’s entrepreneurship ever since its launch three years ago. A large number of women entrepreneurs are a part of AISECT and are operating their centres successfully. Women constitute around 50 percent of the workforce at AISECT. AISECT plans to continue to empower women in the future. During the concluding session of the summit, film actress and theatre artist Tisca Chopra and Jayshree Kiyawat (director, National Rural Health Mission) felicitated some of the most successful women entrepreneurs of AISECT as well as prominent women achievers of Bhopal for their distinguished work.

AISECT Group of Universities
Choubey has established a number of educational institutions and universities mostly in rural areas. The first AISECT group of universities was established in 2006 at a village named Kota in the Bilaspur district of Naxal affected Chhattisgarh state. Named after the C V Raman the Dr. C.V. Raman University is the first private university in central India. The university has more than 10,000 on-campus students studying in various streams. AISECT established four more universities in Madhya Pradesh, Bihar and Jharkhand named as Rabindranath Tagore University-Bhopal, Dr. C.V. Raman University, Bihar, AISECT University, Jharkhand and Dr. C.V. Raman University, Khandwa.

References

Living people
1955 births
Indian company founders
People from Khandwa
20th-century Indian businesspeople
21st-century Indian businesspeople
Ashoka India Fellows